Poo Ramu (1962 – 27 June 2022) was an Indian actor who appeared in Tamil language films as a supporting actor.<ref>{{Cite web |last=மாதேவன் |first=சந்தோஷ் |title=```அன்பே சிவம்' கமல் கதாபாத்திரம் என்னுடையதுதான்..! - `பூ' ராமு |url=https://cinema.vikatan.com/kollywood/155390-an-exclusive-interview-with-actor-poo-ramu |url-status=live |archive-url=https://web.archive.org/web/20230124165330/https://cinema.vikatan.com/kollywood/155390-an-exclusive-interview-with-actor-poo-ramu |archive-date=2023-01-24 |access-date=2023-01-24 |website=Ananda Vikatan}}</ref>

Career
Ramu was a member of the Tamil Nadu Progressive Writers’ Association, and from 1990 to 2005, Ramu was a part of the theatre group Chennai Kalai Kuzhu.

Ramu began his acting career as a street theatre artiste, reprising a role as a theatre actor in the "Naatukoru Seithi Solla" song as a part of his film debut Anbe Sivam (2003). He garnered acclaim in the film industry for his role in the critically acclaimed 2008 film Poo by Sasi. He subsequently took on the name of the film as his stagename, and later went on to notably feature in Neerparavai (2012), Pariyerum Perumal (2018) and Nedunalvaadai (2019).

 Death 
Ramu died on 27 June 2022 aged 60. He had been admitted to the Rajiv Gandhi Government General Hospital in Chennai, after he a cardiac arrest during the previous week.

 Filmography Anbe Sivam (2003)Thavamai Thavamirundhu (2005)Poo (2008)Neerparavai (2012)Thanga Meenkal (2013)Jilla (2014)Kaadu (2014)Thilagar (2015)Sivappu (2015)Vellaiya Irukiravan Poi Solla Maatan (2015)Kandadhai Sollugiren (2016)Peranbu (2018)Mersal (2017)Pariyerum Perumal (2018)Nedunalvaadai (2019)Kanne Kalaimaane (2019)Soorarai Pottru (2020)Ka Pae Ranasingam (2020)Karnan (2021)Kodiyil Oruvan (2021)Rocky (2021)Anbulla Ghilli (2022)Nanpakal Nerathu Mayakkam (2023)Idam Porul Yaeval'' (2023)

References

External links

1962 births
2022 deaths
21st-century Indian male actors
Male actors in Tamil cinema